Dakuku Adol Peterside is a Nigerian politician. He was formerly the Director General of Nigerian Maritime Administration and Safety Agency since March 2016. Prior to his role at NIMASA, he was a member of the Nigerian House of Representatives.

Early life and education 
Peterside was born in Biriye, Kingdom of Opobo, and grew up in Azumini, Aba in present-day Abia State, and in Kaduna and Port Harcourt at various times.

Having graduated from Okrika Grammar School in 1986/87, he went to Rivers State University of Science and Technology (RSUST) in Port Harcourt, where he studied medical laboratory sciences, specializing in haematology and blood transfusion. He was elected National President, National Union of Rivers State Students in January 1992. He was also editor of the student paper Kampuswatch. Peterside returned to RSUST and earned a master's degree in Management. He got his doctoral degree from the University of Port Harcourt.

Peterside is a member of the Nigerian Institute of Management, a fellow of the Institute of Management Consultants of Nigeria, and a member of the Institute of Medical Laboratory Sciences of Nigeria.

Political career 
When he graduated from RSUST, he joined public service. He was first appointed Special Assistant to Governor of Rivers State Peter Odili on Student and Youth Affairs in August 1999 at the age of 29.

Peterside was elected to the House of Representatives in 2011, and served between May 2011 and May 2015 as chairman, House Committee on Petroleum Resources (Downstream) where he had the privilege to oversight strategic National Oil and Gas establishments such as Petroleum Equalisation Fund, Petroleum Products Pricing Regulatory Agency, Pipelines and Products Marketing Company. He co-over sighted Petroleum Technology Development Fund. He led other legislators to sponsor and champion the Petroleum Industry Bill as chairman of the technical Committee of the House of Representatives.  He presented a total of 36 scholar papers in five countries on the reform of Oil and Gas industry and government institutions in developing countries.

Before serving as commissioner of Works, Peterside had served as Executive Director, Development and Leadership Institute 2003–2007, Senior Special Assistant to Governor of Rivers State on works (2003–2005), chairman, Opobo–Nkoro LGA (2002–2003), Special Assistant to Governor of Rivers State on Youths and Student Affairs (1999–2002). He also served concurrently on the Board of Centre for Black and African Arts and Culture.

He served as Rivers State Commissioner of Works from October 2007 to January 2011. As Commissioner of works, he managed the largest construction portfolio ever in the history of state government's construction, supervising a total of 200 road projects (totaling 1,000 km), 5 flyover bridges, and 10 bridges in four years.

In March 2020, Nigerian President Muhammadu Buhari replaced Peterside with Bashir Y. Jamoh as Director-General of NIMASA.

Awards and honours 
 NIMASA awarded as the Public Organisation of the year 2016 Awards by Tell Magazine
 Peterside received the award of excellence in public life as "Student-friendly" by Uniport Students Union Government in 2011
 In 2019, he received the Maritime Living Legend award from Maritime Media Limited for his contributions to Nigeria's maritime sector.

Personal life  
Peterside is married to Elima, a lawyer and with three children, Soba, Belema and Miebi.

See also 
 List of people from Rivers State

References 

1970 births
Living people
People associated with the 2015 Rivers State gubernatorial election
People from Opobo
Rivers State gubernatorial candidates
Rivers State University alumni
University of Port Harcourt alumni
Assistants to the Governor of Rivers State
Rivers State Commissioners of Works
Members of the House of Representatives (Nigeria) from Rivers State
All Progressives Congress politicians
Local politicians in Rivers State
Heads of government agencies of Nigeria